The State Information Service is an Egyptian government agency affiliated to the Egyptian Presidency. It is the official media and public relations apparatus of the Egyptian state, with a number of local and international offices, and its responsible for regulating the affairs of foreign press and media correspondents in Egypt.

History

The SIS was founded in 1954 as the Information Authority (maslahat al-isti'lamat, Arabic: مصلحة الإستعلامات) by the Revolutionary Command Council in the eve of the republican era, two years after the Free Officers led by colonel Gamal Abdel Nasser toppled King Farouk and abolished the Monarchy. Revolutionary Command Council member Salah Salem was SIS's first Chairman.

In 1967 it was restructured into the State Information Service (SIS) and affiliated to the Ministry of Culture and National Guidance (wizarat al-thaqafa wal-irshad al-qawmi), during Tharwat Okasha's tenure, and given the mandate of supporting the ministry in "identifying local and international public opinion towards issues and events that concern the state, and in the field of guiding, educating and enlightening local public opinion." 

The SIS was given ten main responsibilities, including guaging public opinion, producing and disseminating media on national issues (pamphlets, books, radio and television programs) to influence local and global public opinion, producing regular briefs for high level government agencies on key local and international political issues, regulating foreign journalism in Egypt, and regulating aspects of local journalism overseen by the ministry of culture.

After the Ministry of Information (the scucessor of the National Guidance portfolio) was spun off the Ministry of Culture in the early 1980s, the SIS was officially transferred to it in 1986.

In September 2012 President Mohamed Morsi issued a decree making SIS an agency subordinate to the presidency instead of the Ministry of Information.

Chairpersons
The SIS has had chairmen that served at high levels of government in the defense, information or foreign affairs ministries, as well as intelligence. The current Chairman of SIS, Diaa Rashwan a journalist and head of the Press Syndicate, he was appointed to the post by president Abdel Fattah el-Sisi in June 2017. Among the previous Chairmen of SIS was Safwat El-Sherif one of the leading and controversial figures in deposed president Hosni Mubarak's government.
Salah Salem (1954 - 1955)

Amin Howeidi (1965 - 1966) 

Ahmed Asmat Abdel-Meguid (1967 - 1967)
Mohamed Hassan al-Zayat (1967 — 1972)
Mohamed Hassan al-Zayat (1972 — 1977, In addition to Minister of Information)
Morsi Saad Eldin Abdel Hamid (1977 — 1979, also presidential spokesperson)

Safwat El-Sherif (1979 - 1980)

Mohamed Hakki (1980 — 1982, also presidential spokesperson)

Mamdouh El Beltagui (1982 - 1993)

Nabil Othman (1994 - 2003)

Taha Abdel Alim (2003 - 2004)

Nasser Kamel (2005 - 2006)

Diaa Rashwan (2017 - present)

International offices

Presidential Decree 1820/1967 mandated SIS to establish an international presence to share and disseninate  facts about Egypt. Today, SIS operates 32 international press offices affiliate to Egypt's consular missions.

Berlin

London

Paris

Washington D.C.

References

Government agencies of Egypt